Thao (Thao: Thau a lalawa), also known as Sao, is the nearly extinct language of the Thao people, an indigenous people of Taiwan from the Sun Moon Lake region in central Taiwan. It is a Formosan language of the Austronesian family; Barawbaw and Shtafari are dialects.

Name
The name Thao literally means "person", from Proto-Austronesian *Cau. It is therefore cognate with the name of the Tsou.

History

In 2014, there were four L1 speakers and a fluent L2 speaker living in Ita Thaw (伊達邵) village (traditionally called Barawbaw), all but one of whom were over the age of sixty. Two elderly native speakers died in December of that year, including chief Tarma (袁明智), age 75. Four elderly L1 speakers and some semi-speakers were reported in 2021.

Phonology

Consonants

Orthographic notes:
 are written .  is though written  in Blust's dictionary.  
 is written 
 is written . It's though written  in Blust's dictionary. 
 is written 

Notes:
The glides  are derived from the underlying vowels  to meet the requirements that syllables must have onset consonants and to indicate stress placement accurately.
[v] is an allophone of  occurring intervocalically.

Vowels

Notes:
Stress is penultimate, otherwise can be written  as in "dadú", but doubling  is also frequently used, as in "daduu".

Morphology

Thao verbs have the following types of focus (Blust 2003:239).

Actor: -um- (present), ma- (future)
Patient: -in, -in-
Locative: -an

Syntax
Thao word order can be both SVO and VSO, although the former is derived from Taiwanese Hokkien (Blust 2003:228).

The Thao personal marker is "ti" (Blust 2003:228). Negatives include "ani" and "antu"; "ata tu" is used in "don't" constructions. The perfect is marked by "iza", the past by an infix just after the primary onset consonant "-in-" and the future by the prefix "a-". Imperatives are marked by "-í" and softer imperatives or requests roughly translated as "please" by "-uan" sometimes spelled "-wan" which can co-occur with "-í".

Pronouns
The Thao personal pronouns below are from Blust (2003:207). Note that there is only 1 form each for "we (exclusive)," "you (plural)" and "they."

Other pronouns include:

minmihu - for you
panmihu - as for you
panihun - because of you
shanaihun - up to you
shaunatazihun - go to your place
shmunaihun - bring to you
nakin - for me
panyakin - as for me
pashiyakin - leave me
shanayayakin - up to me
shmunayakin - bring me

Affixes
The following affixes are sourced from Blust (2003:92-188) and adjusted to the modern spelling.

a- : only found in /kan/ 'eat'
-ak : '1st person singular (I)'
ak- ... -in : 'morning, noon, evening meals'
an- : uncertain function
-an : Verbal uses can be indicative, imperative, or adversative.
i- : prefix or clitic particle marking location
-i : imperative
-ik : patient focus (1st person singular)
-in- : perfective or completive aspect
-in : patient focus
ish- : found most with intransitive verbs (uncommon prefix)
ka- : 'to make an X', 'two times' (with reduplication)
ka- ... -an : meaning unclear
kal- : 'X told'
kalh- : 'to pile, spread'
kash- : 'intensity, repetition'
kashi- : meaning uncertain
kashi- ... -an : 'pull by the X'
kashun- : derives verbs referring to positions of the human body, or sometimes objects such as boats
kat- : 'gradually become X'
ki- : 'stand, stay'; other possible meanings as well
ki- ... -an : 'be affected with pain in the X'
kilh- : 'search for, seek'
kin- : 'to pick or gather X'
kit- ... -in : 'infested with X'
ku- : 'to perform an action with X' (when used with tools or weapons); less specific in other contexts
kun- : 'sudden or abrupt action', 'to eat the X meal', 'to do X times'; meaning unclear sometimes
la- : usually found in expressions of quantity of degree
lhin- : causative sense
lhun- : swelling-related meanings, etc.
m- : marks the genitive in 'you (2s)' and 'we (incl.)'
ma- : marks stative verbs, occasionally nouns derived from stative verbs
ma- : active verb prefix
ma- : prefix marking the future in actor focus verbs
ma- : 'tens' (used with numbers)
mak- : intransitive verbs
maka- : 'to resemble X' (people), 'produce X' (plant or animal parts), 'from/in/to X' (deictic/directional expressions)
makin- : intransitive verbs; 'Xth from the bottom' (with numerals)
makit- : 'happen gradually', 'perform X gradually'
maku- : directional sense, and is followed by /na/- (though it does not follow not in non-locative expressions)
malhi- : 'give birth to an X'
man- : generally used with dynamic, intransitive verbs
mana- : generally found with directional verbs
mapa- : 'reciprocal', 'collective action'
mash- : 'to speak X' (language), 'walk with an X' (positions or conditions of the leg)
masha- : relates to body positions, or may have a directional meaning
mashi- : comparatives (with stative bases of measurement); often synonymous with /ma/- (stative verb marker)
mat- : derives intransitive or stative verbs
mati- : locative expressions
matin- + full reduplication : 'X-ish' or 'spotted with X' (colors)
mi- : derives intransitive verbs, often with some form of base reduplication
mi- + Ca reduplication : 'do with a group of X'
mya- : used to derive various verbs
min- : derives inchoative verbs (Bunun loan?); 'become an X' or 'become like an X' (with kinship terms)
mu- : most frequently derives verbs of motion; 'go into X; enter X' (with concrete nouns that refer to structures or places capable of being entered); 'search for X' (with names of useful plants); 'do X times' (numeral bases and expressions of quantity)
mun- : intransitive verbs
-n : derives accusative pronouns from nominative bases
na- : most commonly with verbs indicating change of location; 'it's up to X'
pa- : causative of dynamic verbs (verbs with -/um/-); 'make X do Y' or 'let X do Y'; active transitive (or intransitive) verb with no causative argument/sense
pak- : 'exude X' (body fluids, other natural fluids/substances); intransitive verb prefix
pan- : 'perform X in a downward direction'
pan- ... -an : used with terms for lineal consanguines to derive the corresponding collateral terms of the same generation (e.g., 'father' > 'uncle', 'grandparent' > 'grandparental sibling')
pash- ... -an : 'place in which X is kept'
pashi- : generally causative sense (often with Ca-reduplication); 'let X do it' or 'let X have it' (with the accusative forms of personal pronouns)
pashi- ... -an : 'put X on' or 'wear X'
pat- : generally causative sense
pi- : causative verbs of location (can be paired with /i/- 'at, in, on'); may also form non-locative verbs
pya- : forms causative verbs (usually have stative counterparts with /ma/-; note that /pa/- and -/um/- are also counterparts.); simulative verb
pik- : generally causative sense
pin- : generally forms causative verbs or deverbal nouns
pish- : 'play X' (musical instruments); inchoative sense (sometimes with an implied element of suddenness); causative sense
pu- : causative or transitive counterpart of the movement prefix /mu/-, which is intransitive; 'use an X' or 'put in an X' (with names of some tools); 'send out an X' (with names of plant parts)
pu- ... -an : to wear X' (body ornaments)
pun- : 'to catch X' (animals used for food)
qata- : bodily movement, observation, and the like
sha- : directional sense ('facing', etc.)
shan-na-Ca- ... : 'it's up to X' (often with pronouns)
shau- : 'go to X' or 'arrive at X' (with bases that have an inherently locative sense or temporal sense)
shi- : appears to mark past tense (as opposed to the perfective aspect marker -/in/-)
shi- : sometimes appears with commands
shi-X-X : 'X-ish, somewhat X'
shi-X-iz: 'X times'
shu- : 'bring X' or 'take X' (with pronominal and deictic bases)
tana- : generally directional sense (from Bunun /tana/- 'prefix of direction')
tau- : 'to carry X' (with concrete nouns); 'to turn to X' (with bases having a directional meaning)
tish- : forms both transitive and intransitive verbs; often refers to results of non-deliberate actions
tu-Ca- ... : 'the odor of X'
-um- : actor focus infix
un- ... -an : 'undesirable bodily conditions or afflictions'; 'figurative extension of a physical affliction'
-un : equivalent of -/in/ 'patient focus' (borrowed from Bunun)
-wak : 1st person singular actor (apparently distinct from -/ak/)
-wan : 'X's turn (to do something)'
ya- : only comes after /mapa/- 'reciprocal or collective action'
-zan : 'X paces' (used with numerals)

Quasi-affixes
kan 'step, walk'
lhqa 'live, living'
pasaháy 'to use'
qalha 'much, many'
sa (usually almost impossible to translate in most environments)

Notes

References

External links

 Robert Blust's audio recordings of Thao are archived with Kaipuleohone
  Yuánzhùmínzú yǔyán xiànshàng cídiǎn 原住民族語言線上詞典  – Thao search page at the "Aboriginal language online dictionary" website of the Indigenous Languages Research and Development Foundation
 Thao teaching and leaning materials published by the Council of Indigenous Peoples of Taiwan 
 Thao translation of President Tsai Ing-wen's 2016 apology to indigenous people – published on the website of the presidential office

Formosan languages
Endangered Austronesian languages